The Hotel Vendome fire in the United States was the worst firefighting tragedy in Boston history. Nine firefighters were killed during the final stages of extinguishing a fire on June 17, 1972.  The Hotel Vendome was on the southwest corner of the intersection of Commonwealth Avenue and Dartmouth Street, in the Back Bay area of Boston.

Background
The Vendome was a luxury hotel built in 1871 in Back Bay, just north of Copley Square. A massive expansion was undertaken in 1881 according to plans by architect J. F. Ober and completed in 1882.

During the 1960s, the Vendome suffered four small fires. In 1971, the year of the original building's centennial, the Vendome was sold. The new owners opened a restaurant called Cafe Vendome on the first floor, and began renovating the remaining hotel into condominiums and a shopping mall.

Fire and collapse 

The building was largely empty the afternoon of Saturday June 17, 1972, except for a few people performing renovations. One of the workers discovered that a fire had begun in an enclosed space between the third and fourth floors, and at 2:35 p.m. rang Box 1571. A working fire was called in at 2:44 p.m., and subsequent alarms were rung at 2:46 p.m., 3:02 p.m., and 3:06 p.m. A total of 16 engine companies, five ladder companies, two aerial towers, and a heavy rescue company responded.

The fire was largely under control by 4:30 p.m.. Several crews, including Boston Fire Department Ladder 13 and Engines 22 and 32, remained on scene performing overhaul and cleanup. At 5:28 p.m., without warning, all five floors of a  section at the southeast corner of the building collapsed, burying  Ladder 15 and 17 firefighters beneath a two-story pile of debris. Nine of the firefighters died, making this the worst firefighting disaster in Boston history in terms of loss of life. The men who were killed were:

Firefighter Thomas W. Beckwith
 Firefighter Joseph F. Boucher
 Lieutenant Thomas J. Carroll
 Firefighter Charles E. Dolan
 Lieutenant John E. Hanbury Jr.
 Firefighter John E. Jameson
 Firefighter Richard B. Magee
 Firefighter Paul J. Murphy
 Firefighter Joseph P. Saniuk

Aftermath
District Fire Chief John P. Vahey wrote a comprehensive report on the Vendome fire. Although the cause of the original fire was not known, the subsequent collapse was attributed to the failure of an overloaded  steel column whose support had been weakened when a new duct had been cut beneath it, triggered by the weight of the firefighters and their equipment on the upper floors.

On June 17, 1997—the 25th anniversary of the Vendome fire—a monument was dedicated on the Commonwealth Avenue Mall, a few yards from the site of the fire. The monument features a fireman's helmet and coat cast in bronze draped over a low arc of dark granite. An inscription bears the timeline of the fire and the names of the men who died. One faces the site of the fire when reading the names.

After the fire, the Vendome was successfully renovated, hosting 110 residential condominium units and 27 commercial units, including a restaurant.

References

Additional sources
 Bunting, Bainbridge, Houses of Boston's Back Bay: An Architectural History, 1840-1917, 1967, 
 Moore, Barbara W. and Weesner, Gail, Back Bay: A Living Portrait, 1995, 
 Sammarco, Anthony Mitchell, Images of America: Boston's Back Bay, 1997, 
 Schorow, Stephanie, Boston on Fire: A history of Fires and Firefighting in Boston, 2003, 
 Shand-Tucci, Douglass, Built in Boston: City and Suburb 1800-1950, 1988, 
 Southworth, Susan & Michael. The Boston Society of Architects' AIA Guide to Boston, 1992,

External links
Boston Fire Department web page about the Hotel Vendome fire via Wayback Machine
Vendome Memorial photos June 17, 2019 via SmugMug

1972 fires in the United States
1972 in Boston
Back Bay, Boston
Fires in Boston
History of Boston
Vendome
June 1972 events in the United States
Urban fires in the United States
Hotel fires in the United States
Building collapses in 1972
Building collapses in Massachusetts
Building collapses caused by fire